San Castle is a census-designated place in Palm Beach County, Florida, United States. Its population was 3,755 as of the 2020 census. San Castle is located between Interstate 95 and the Intracoastal Waterway; it borders Lantana to the south, Hypoluxo to the west and Boynton Beach to the northeast.

Demographics 

As of 2016; San Castle, FL is home to a population of 4,358 people, from which 77.7% are citizens. The ethnic composition of the population of San Castle, FL is; Black or African American (49.3%), Hispanic or Latino (30.4%), White (19.5%), Asian (0.57%), Other (0.18%).

The most common foreign languages spoken in San Castle, FL are English at 50.4%, French Creole at 31%, Spanish at 18.3% and Chinese at 0.3%.

In 2015, the median household income of the 1,078 households in San Castle, FL grew to $49,107 from the previous year's value of $42,869.

Crime 
Despite its small size, the CDP has been notable for being home to the San Castle Soldiers, a set of the greater Top 6 gang; who was featured on the show Gangland, on the History Channel. The gang is notorious for being involved in the Christmas Eve shooting at the Boynton Beach Mall, which resulted in a death. The gang was also involved in several other homicides.

References 

Census-designated places in Palm Beach County, Florida
Census-designated places in Florida
Unincorporated communities in Palm Beach County, Florida
Unincorporated communities in Florida